was a Japanese idol trio formed in 1973, their first single being . Songwriters included Michio Yamagami, Kōichi Morita, Yūsuke Hoguchi, and Kazuya Senka. The group was popular among young Japanese people.

History

Biography
They were a representative idol group of Japan in the 1970s along with Pink Lady.

In 1977, at the height of their popularity, they dropped out of the music business with the famous phrase of  Their farewell concert was held at the Korakuen Stadium on April 4, 1978.

A few years after leaving the industry, Ran and Sue came back as actresses. Miki returned to singing, but quit shortly after getting married.

In 2008, there were plans for a Candies reunion tour to celebrate 35 years since their debut and 30 years since their epic farewell concert. The tour never came about, mainly due to Sue's acting schedule and Miki's desire to remain out of the public eye for the sake of her family. However, the trio contributed pictures and essays to release a commemoration "Time Capsule" best-of album instead and did not meet during production.

Sue died from breast cancer in April 2011. Ran and Miki delivered the eulogy at her funeral. Sue also left behind a recording of her final thoughts. In this recording (as well as in Miki's eulogy), it was revealed that all three members never again had the chance to reunite, yet have always desired to perform again. (In 2019, Ran Ito started performing again as a solo singer)

In 2011, the Japanese music program Music Station listed them in their Top 50 Idols of All-time based on their sales figures. They were placed no. 32, with sales exceeding 5,000,000.

Discography 

 Anata ni Muchū: Uchiki na Candies (1973)
 Abunai Doyōbi: Candies no Sekai (1974)
 Namida no Kisetsu (1974)
 Toshishita no Otokonoko (1975)
 Sono Ki ni Sasenaide (1975)
 Haru Ichiban (1976)
 Natsu ga Kita! (1976)
 Candies 1½ Yasashii Akuma (1977)
 Candy Label (1977)
 Candies 1676 Days (1977)
 Sōshunfu (1978)

Filmography

TV

Kōhaku Uta Gassen appearances

See also 
 Japanese idol
 Pink Lady
 Momoe Yamaguchi
 Junko Sakurada

References

External links 

Candies at Oricon
Candies at Idol.ne.jp

Japanese pop music groups
Japanese girl groups
Japanese idol groups
Musical groups from Tokyo
Vocal trios
1973 establishments in Japan
1978 disestablishments in Japan
Musical groups established in 1973
Musical groups disestablished in 1978
Japanese musical trios